Kalavangah (also Romanized as Kalāvangāh and Kalāvengāh; also known as Kalāvanga and Kalāvengā) is a village in Owzrud Rural District, Baladeh District, Nur County, Mazandaran Province, Iran . At the 2006 census, its population was 39, in 13 families.

References 

Populated places in Nur County